Emily is a 2022 British biographical drama film written and directed by Frances O'Connor in her directorial debut. It is a part-fictional portrait of English writer Emily Brontë (played by Emma Mackey), concentrating on a fictional romantic relationship with the young curate William Weightman. Fionn Whitehead, Oliver Jackson-Cohen, Alexandra Dowling, Amelia Gething, Adrian Dunbar and Gemma Jones also appear in supporting roles.

Emily premiered at the 2022 Toronto International Film Festival before being theatrically released in the United Kingdom by Warner Bros. Pictures on 14 October 2022.

Plot
As Emily Brontë is ill and near death, her older sister Charlotte asks her what inspired her to write her novel Wuthering Heights.

Sometime in the past Charlotte, nearly graduated from school, returns home for a visit. Emily tries to talk to her about the fictional worlds she has been creating while Charlotte was at school, but Charlotte tries to dissuade her from these juvenile activities.

At the same time William Weightman, a new curate, arrives. While her sisters and several other young women seem enamoured of the young man, Emily is dismissive of him. While visiting the Brontë home, Weightman partakes in a game the Brontës have invented where they take turns donning a mask and impersonating a character, with the other members guessing who the character is. When it is Emily's turn, she claims to be possessed by the ghost of their deceased mother; a strong wind bursts open the windows. Charlotte, Anne and Branwell become distressed, while Weightman is disturbed by the scene. The mask is buried in the ground.

Emily goes with Charlotte to her school to learn to be a teacher, while her brother Branwell goes to study at the Royal Academy of Arts. Both Emily and Branwell return shortly after as failures, Branwell proclaiming he is now more interested in writing and Emily at a loss for what to do.

Emily's father engages Weightman to teach Emily French, which he does, while arguing religious philosophy with her. Branwell encourages Emily to drink and play, and Emily uses some opium she finds in a desk, and has "Freedom in thought" tattooed on her arm like Branwell has; their favourite pastime involves staring in the window of a local family and scaring them at night. They are eventually caught, but when Emily denies her involvement, Branwell is sent to work for the family as a tutor as punishment. Branwell is caught kissing the mistress of the house and is sent elsewhere in disgrace.

Emily and Weightman grow increasingly close and begin a romantic and sexual entanglement. When Charlotte returns and begins to suspect an affinity between the two, Weightman abruptly ends their relationship. Emily is devastated and takes out her anger on Branwell, telling him that his attempts at fiction are clichéd and trite. To move on with her life, Emily decides to leave with Charlotte for Brussels. She tells Weightman she no longer intends to write. Weightman writes Emily a letter urging her to change her mind, which he gives to Branwell, who reads its contents and does not pass on the message. 

In Brussels, Emily has a vision of Weightman and shortly after receives news that he died of cholera. The sisters return to tend an ailing Branwell. His final act before dying is to give Emily Weightman's letter in which he urges her to continue to write. After Branwell's death Emily writes Wuthering Heights. Now on her death bed, Emily confesses to Charlotte that she was in love with Weightman, and asks Charlotte to burn the love letters between the two after she dies. Charlotte does so and begins to write her own works.

Cast

 Emma Mackey as Emily Brontë
 Fionn Whitehead as Branwell Brontë
 Oliver Jackson-Cohen as William Weightman 
 Alexandra Dowling as Charlotte Brontë
 Amelia Gething as Anne Brontë
 Adrian Dunbar as Patrick Brontë
 Gemma Jones as Aunt Branwell

Production
The film was announced in May 2020 with Emma Mackey cast in the titular role, with Joe Alwyn, Fionn Whitehead and Emily Beecham being cast as people in Emily’s life. Frances O'Connor was set to write and direct the film. Both Alwyn and Beecham left the project prior to the start of filming in April 2021, with Oliver Jackson-Cohen, Alexandra Dowling, Amelia Gething, Gemma Jones and Adrian Dunbar joining the cast. Filming began in Yorkshire on 16 April 2021 and concluded on 26 May.

Warner Bros. UK distributes the film in its native United Kingdom as well as the Republic of Ireland.

Release
Emily had its world premiere in the Platform Prize lineup at the 2022 Toronto International Film Festival on September 9, 2022.  The film premiered at the 2022 Toronto International Film Festival before being theatrically released in the United Kingdom by Warner Bros. Pictures on 14 October 2022.

Reception

Critical response
Review aggregator Rotten Tomatoes reports that 90% of 111 critics have given the film a positive review, with an average rating of 7.4 out of 10. The website's critical consensus reads, "With a bracingly irreverent approach to its story and Emma Mackey bringing Brontë vibrantly to life, Emily is a biopic that manages to feel true while taking entertaining creative liberties." Metacritic, which uses a weighted average, assigned the film a score of 75 out of 100, based on 35 critics, indicating "generally favorable reviews".

In his review for The Guardian, Peter Bradshaw describes the film as "beautifully acted, lovingly shot, fervently and speculatively imagined". Mark Kermode describes Emily as a "full-blooded gothic fable", praising O’Connor's "spine-tingling feature debut".

The film received three awards at the Dinard British Film Festival: Golden Hitchcock, Best Performance Award for Emma Mackey and Audience Award.

Accolades

References

External links
 

2022 films
Films about writers
Films shot in Yorkshire
British biographical drama films
Warner Bros. films
2020s British films
2022 biographical drama films
2020s English-language films